Vittorio Orsenigo (Milan, 5 August 1926) is an Italian  short story writer, novelist and theater director.
Most of his fame came in the later years of his life, as he developed his career as a writer when he was almost 80.

Life

Theater Director
Orsenigo started working in the Italian artistic panorama after the Second World War. Following the invitation of Elio Vittorini, he presented a selection of theatrical works by Christopher Isherwood, Bertold Brecht and Wystan Hugh Auden, whose works were not yet popular in Italy in that period. In 1950 Orsenigo started working at Piccolo Teatro di Milano thanks to its director Paolo Grassi. He directed Alfred Jarry's piece Ubu Roy and Guillaume Apollinaire.
In that occasion, Orsenigo met Pierluigi Pizzi, who was a beginner at that time. The two started working together and Pizzi drew scenography and costumes for Orsenigo's works. Later in the Eighties, Salvatore Quasimodo stated he was interested in Orsenigo's theatrical works.
In the Fifties, Orsenigo also met the writer and critic Raffaele Carrieri. Orsenigo was also a good painter and Carrieri loved his works. Because of this, in 1981 Orsenigo had his first exhibition in Milan for which Achille Bonito Oliva wrote the catalogue.
Orsenigo exhibited again in 1984 in Milan and in 1985 at Palazzo dei Diamanti in Ferrara.

Writer
In the Fifties, Orsenigo had already developed some interest in writing. His first book was a collection of poems named Come gli occhi di sabbia; later in 1954 he published the tale La demenza di giacomo. But only in the Nineties he restarted his activity with La linea gotica and published some works on the Italian magazines Resine Letterarie and La nuova prosa. In the same years Orsenigo also performed translations for the Sellerio and Archinto. In 2001 his friend Giuseppe Pontiggia wrote the preface of Settore editoriale; Orsenigo exchanged the courtesy five years later for Pontiggia's Lettere. 
The Italian critic Massimo Onofri started looking at Orsenigo's work in 2004. One year after, when Commedianti a Milano was published, he stated that "more than a memorial, it is a milanese meditation. [...] if Visite  concerns the irremediabile loss of the only loved son, Commedianti would look as a book of euphoric and utopica youthness, filled with uncompleted novels and never published books, uncompleted as it is life itself. But remain the fact that writing for true writers always turns around few obsessions:  Quasimodo got a Nobel Prize and disappeared. Vittorini, Banfi, Carrieri – a part from the Nobel – made the same joke. It is not their fault, but the raging of deaths makes the search for the detail more difficult".

In 2008, Orsenigo was already 83 years old and succeeded to extend his fame with two best-sellers: L'uccellino della radio and La camera d'ambra, the latest published with a preface by Sergio Romano. His novels were published for the publishers Archinto and Rizzoli Imprimatur; in 2015 was the time for A Enea Finzi non sparano in fronte, set during the war period.

Style
Orsenigo has a direct realistic style, but filled with imaginations and frequent digressions. He wrote about places where he used to live: Milan during the Second World War (Commedianti a Milano, L'uccellino della radio), mountains and woods (Il pizzini di amblar) and exotic lands (Una camera tutta d'ambra, Tanti viaggi).
Daniela Marcheschi noted that Orsenigo is "Bizzar and digressive following a humoristic tradition that, through Porta and Rajberti, had prosperous developments in Milan's culture and in the Italian literature of the XIX century afterwords".<ref>Afterword for Cosa trovi nell'acqua, 2014, Archinto</ref>

Works

Poetry
 Come gli occhi di sabbia, anni '50

Narrative
 La demenza di Giacomo, 1954
 La linea gotica, Marietti, 1990
 I libri di Sfax, Greco & Greco, 1991 (con lo pseudonimo di Claude Solenzara)
 Fotografie, rivista Nuova Prosa (romanzo a puntate)
 E... venti racconti appena incominciati, Greco & Greco, 1995
 Mulino da preghiera, Greco & Greco, 1996
 Il verme solitario e altri animali quasi domestici, Greco & Greco, 1997, with Guido Almansi, Roberto Barbolini, Lucio Klobas, Roberto Pazzi, Giovanni Pederiali
 Centotre storie di seduzione (e una postilla), Mobydick, 1998
 In Africa con Alain, Greco & Greco
 Dreyfus, Collana Cristallo di Rocca n. 10, Greco & Greco, 1999, with Giangilberto Monti
 Piuma danzante, Greco & Greco, 1999
 Messaggi dal piccolo zoo, Archinto, 1999 
 Storie zoppe, Lupetti e Manni, 1995 
 Corpo, Mobydick, 2001
 Settore editoriale, Archinto, 2001
 Visite guidate, Archinto, 2004 
 Commedianti a Milano, Aliberti, 2005 
 Telefono, Gaffi, 2006 
 Lettere a Giuseppe Pontiggia: il cercatore di funghi in Carinzia, Archinto, 2006
 L'uccellino della radio, Gaffi, 2008
 Vittorio Imbriani, Dio ne scampi dagli Orsenigo & Vittorio Orsenigo, Dio ne scampi dagli Imbriani, Aragno editore
 Rina ne uccide quattro, Aliberti, 2009 
 Collezioni: un amoroso safari, Archinto, 2009 
 Spiagge, Greco & Greco, 2010 
 Tanti viaggi, Archinto, 2011 
 La camera d'ambra, Greco & Greco, 2013 
 I pizzini di Amblar, Lietocolle,  2013 
 Cosa trovi nell'acqua, Archinto, 2014, 
 A Enea Finzi non sparano in fronte, Imprimatur RCS libri, 2015, 

Translations and curatorships
 Guillaume Apollinaire, Il poeta assassinato, Greco&Greco, 1991 
 Carlo Collodi, Giannettino Carlo Collodi, Pipì lo scimmiottino color di rosa Angelo Maria Ricci, Gli sposi fedeli Samuel Johnson, La storia di Rasselas Principe di Abissinia, Sellerio, 1993
 A Giacomo Casanova. Lettere d'amore di Manon Balletti - Elisa von der Recke, Milano, Archinto 1997, 
 Guillaume Apollinaire, Lou mia regina, Archinto, 1999
 Georges Picard, Piccolo trattato ad uso di chi vuol avere sempre ragione'', Archinto, 2002

References

External links

Italian male novelists
Living people
20th-century Italian novelists
20th-century Italian male writers
21st-century Italian novelists
Italian male poets
20th-century Italian poets
Italian male short story writers
1926 births
Writers from Milan
20th-century Italian short story writers
21st-century Italian short story writers
21st-century Italian male writers